William E. Brooks may refer to:

 William Edwin Brooks (1828–1899), Irish civil engineer and ornithologist
 Bucky Brooks (William Eldridge Brooks, Jr., born 1971), American sportswriter